Daniel Raymond "Quiz" Quisenberry (February 7, 1953 – September 30, 1998) was an American right-handed relief pitcher in Major League Baseball who played primarily for the Kansas City Royals. Notable for his submarine-style pitching delivery and his humorous quotes, he led the American League in saves a record five times (1980, 1982–85). Quisenberry retired in 1990 with 244 saves, then the fifth-highest total in major league history.

Early life
Quisenberry was born in Santa Monica, California. His name is not the name of a fruit, but the English mutation of the German surname Questenberg, a village in Saxony-Anhalt. His parents divorced when he was 7 years old and his mother remarried Art Meola, a Rockwell International engineer who encouraged him and his older brother to play baseball. Quisenberry played baseball at Costa Mesa High School/Middle School. In 1973, while attending Orange Coast College, he was named team MVP. He was then recruited by the University of La Verne, a Church of the Brethren college, where he met his future wife, Janie Howard, while attending a class in square dancing.

Career
Quisenberry signed with the Royals as an amateur free agent in 1975 for a Class A team in Waterloo, Iowa and pitched a complete game in his first start. At the end of the season, he was promoted to the Double-A team in Jacksonville, Florida. At the time, he worked for a sporting goods store during the day and a mortuary at night. In the winter of 1978, he attended Fresno Pacific University, affiliated with the Mennonite Brethren Church, to get a teaching degree in case his baseball career was not successful.

On July 8, 1979, at the age of 26, he made his major league debut with the Kansas City Royals against the Chicago White Sox, pitching  scoreless innings, and surrendering just two hits and no walks. Quisenberry appeared in 32 games and posted a  record with a 3.15 earned run average and five saves.

During spring training in 1980, manager Jim Frey suggested that Quisenberry learn the submarine-style delivery from Pittsburgh Pirates reliever Kent Tekulve to confuse hitters, because he could not overpower them with a fastball. From 1980 to 1985, Quisenberry was the American League's dominant closer leading the American League in saves all six season (with the exception of the strike-shortened 1981 season). During that same span, he posted an ERA of 2.45 and won the Rolaids Relief Man Award each season. He also finished in the top five in voting for the Cy Young Award during this span.

Unlike many of his peer closers, Quisenberry did not possess a hard fastball, and thus had to rely on pinpoint control, guile, and deception, which was augmented by the submarine delivery he first used in 1980. His primary pitch was a sinking fastball, which causes hitters to hit the ball on the ground rather than in the air. He also threw a curveball, a changeup he developed in 1984, and an occasional knuckleball. Although Quisenberry was not a strikeout pitcher (averaging only 3.3 strikeouts per nine innings during his career), he offset this deficiency by seldom walking batters or throwing wild pitches. His 45 saves in 1983 set a single-season record (tied in 1984 by Bruce Sutter and broken in 1986 by Dave Righetti), and set a team record that was matched in 1993 by Jeff Montgomery and surpassed in 2013 by Greg Holland. Quisenberry was the first pitcher in major league history to save more than 40 games in a season twice in his career. He won a World Series with the Royals in 1985 and was the winning pitcher of Game 6, notorious for Don Denkinger's blown call at first base.

In 1983, the Royals signed Quisenberry to a lifetime contract, similar to the contract of his teammate, George Brett. However, a rocky start in 1988 led to Quisenberry's relegation to middle relief and mop-up duty. Shortly before the All-Star break, he was released by the Royals. Ten days later, the St. Louis Cardinals, managed by ex-Royals manager Whitey Herzog, signed Quisenberry as a free agent. After pitching for a year and a half in St. Louis, Quisenberry signed to play with the San Francisco Giants in 1990. He tore his rotator cuff just five appearances into the 1990 season; this was the first serious injury of his career. Quisenberry retired from baseball in 1990 with 244 saves, then the fifth-highest total in major league history.

In the 1996 Baseball Hall of Fame balloting by the Baseball Writers' Association of America, Quisenberry received 18 votes, just under the 24 vote (5%) cut-off to remain on the ballot. In the same election, Bruce Sutter, a pitcher with remarkably similar overall statistics, received 137 votes; Sutter went on to be elected to the National Baseball Hall of Fame and Museum in 2006. In 2013, Quisenberry's Hall of Fame candidacy was given a second look by the Expansion Era Committee, which reexamines the credentials of overlooked players from 1973–present, but he fell short of the 12 votes needed from the 16-member panel.

Along with Sutter and Rich Gossage, Quisenberry was at the forefront of the transition from relief ace to the Tony La Russa ninth inning closer.

Personal life
Quisenberry and his wife lived in Kansas City. They had 2 children, Alysia Quisenberry Carter and David Quisenberry. The family supported the Harvesters Food Bank.

Quisenberry was religious. Originally considered a hothead, Quisenberry credited his wife as well as Christianity for calming him down.

After his baseball career ended, Quisenberry became a poet, publishing three poems in 1995 and a book of poetry titled On Days Like This in 1998. He was also one of baseball's most quotable characters, with bon mots like "I found a delivery in my flaw" and "I've seen the future and it's much like the present, only longer." (The latter quote, however, had been published verbatim nearly two decades prior.)

Death
In January 1998, Quisenberry cut short a snowboarding vacation in Colorado because of headaches, dizzy spells, and blurred vision. Quisenberry was diagnosed with grade IV astrocytoma, a highly malignant form of brain cancer. He died at age 45 in September 1998 in Leawood, Kansas.

See also

List of Major League Baseball annual saves leaders
List of notable brain tumor patients
Major League Baseball titles leaders

Further reading

References

External links

 Dan Quisenberry at SABR (Baseball BioProject)
 The Atlantic: "How Athletes Ensure Immortality"
 

1953 births
1998 deaths
Major League Baseball pitchers
Kansas City Royals players
San Francisco Giants players
St. Louis Cardinals players
American League All-Stars
American League saves champions
Baseball players from Santa Monica, California
Deaths from brain cancer in the United States
Waterloo Royals players
Jacksonville Suns players
Omaha Royals players
La Verne Leopards baseball players
University of La Verne alumni